Bydgoszcz displays an abundant variety of architectures, with styles from neo-gothic, neo-baroque and neoclassicism, to Art Nouveau and modernism; hence its nickname of Little Berlin at the start of the 20th century. The notable granaries on Mill Island and along Brda river also recall a recognized timber-framed characteristics of the city in Poland.

The period stretching from 1850 to the Second Polish Republic witnessed the greatest development of the city. In the mid-19th century, the arrival of the Prussian Eastern Railway contributed greatly to the development of Bromberg. After WWI, with the re-attachment of the town to the new state of Poland, Bydgoszcz underwent anew a growth, while German residents fled.

Most of the constructions of these time, still preserved today, are linked to a number of architects who left (for a few of them) a profound mark on the current architectural landscape of the city.

Prussian Period (1850–1918)

City construction advisors 
During Prussian Partition, Bromberg fell under Prussian law, in particular regarding construction matter, which was organized with a strictly defined hierarchy. On top were builders and architects with great competences and skills, chosen to act as  municipal construction councilors. The position of building consultant was one of the most important in the city administration. This advisor participated in almost all areas of Bromberg public life, from security, transport to urban land management and development. Building councilors supervised all construction activities within the city premises, but also developed plans for official buildings funded from municipal budget. They were independent, but nevertheless cooperated actively in the city council. From 1871 to 1920, Bromberg authorities nominated five municipal construction councilors.

Heinrich Grüder (1871–1877)
He succeeded to city building advisor von Müller, who designed the blueprint of the edifice at 9 Jagiellońska street 
in Bydgoszcz (today, it houses the seat of the Kujawsko-Pomorskie Centre for Education and Kuyavian-Pomeranian Voivodeship Marshal's Office). Heinrich Grüder took up function as municipal construction adviser on November 16, 1871. He was educated as a master bricklayer in Mecklenburg, before moving in 1860, to work for a few months in Vienna. He came to Bromberg via Osnabrück, where he worked as a builder. Little is known about his activities in Bydgoszcz. Grüder is thought to have designed the school building project at 2 Konarskiego street (today Bydgoszcz School of Fine Arts), together with its gymnasium at Nr.4. In the years 1872–1876, he conducted the erection of the Evangelical church on Weltzin Place (nowadays Plac Wolności), on a design by Berlin architect Friedrich Adler. Appreciated for his professionalism, Grüder left Bromberg to Poznań in October 1877 where he worked as city advisor.

Wilhelm Lincke (1878–1885)
Wilhelm Lincke was born in 1846, in Magdeburg. He graduated from city high school in 1863. Then, for two years, he attended the Royal School of Fine Arts and the Institute of Crafts for the Study of Architecture in Magdeburg. Later he moved to Berlin: there he studied at the Royal Academy of Construction from 1865 to 1867. Afterwards, he was employed till 1873 on railways projects, building railway stations (Gotha, Erfurt, Weimar, Naumburg, Weißenfels) and other technical facilities. In 1870, he took part in Franco-Prussian War. Later, he is found to work in Zgorzelec Municipal Construction Office, then in Wiesbaden (1876). In January 1878, he accepted the position of city construction counselor in Bromberg where he stayed until his death on November 28, 1885, aged 39.

As a construction adviser, he approved a number of private building projects. He had a significant influence on the projects realized at that time, generally referring to Neoclassicism and Neo-renaissance. 
He is mainly remembered for his work on the reconstruction of the former Jesuit College building, so as to fit the city authorities; he worked on it in collaboration with Albert Rose and Heinrich Mautz. In addition, he was the author of other projects funded from municipal budget:
 the adaptation and expansion in 1878, of the former monastery of the Poor Clares to house a municipal hospital (today Building of the District Museum in Bydgoszcz at 4 Gdańska Street). He designed the façade with Neo-renaissance and Neo-Manerism forms;
 the design of the building of the Municipal School for Girls in 1884, at 5 Konarskiego street (today building of the Catering School of Bydgoszcz);
 the design of the second city hospital, at Seminaryjna street (1884-1885), nowadays the Center of Pulmonology of Bydgoszcz.

Carl Meyer (1886–1912)
Carl Meyer was born on December 17, 1855, in the family of the manufacturer GL Meyer in Estorf in Nienburg district, Lower Saxony province. After an education in a private school in neighboring Husum, he attended the Royal High School of Verden an der Aller. On October 1, 1875, he was employed in the technical office of the Royal Railway Commission in Hanover, and in 1876, he began studies at the Polytechnic University of Hanover, from where he graduated cum laude in 1880. He was a student of German architects Conrad Wilhelm Hase, A. Schröder and W. Schuch.
In 1881, he started a two-year practice in public service in Silesia, in the area of Jelenia Góra, as a construction manager.

At the death of Wilhelm Lincke, Bromberg authorities selected Carl Meyer as his successor on December 15, 1885. He took up the function of city building councilor on January 5, 1886. On November 30, 1891, he entered Janus Masonic lodge, and served as its master from 1907 to 1912. For several years he lived at 60 Gdańska street, downtown Bydgoszcz.
At the end of his first contract period, City Council re-elected him on July 14, 1898, for a second term and then on July 14, 1910, for another one. However, Carl Meyer fell ill in the autumn 1911 and had to retire on April 1, 1912. He then left Bydgoszcz for Berlin in 1919 and later returned to his homeland and settled in Hanover. His death date (ca. 1920s) has not been determined precisely. In recognition for his merits, he was twice honored with Prussian state decorations: the Order of the Red Eagle - 4th class (1905), and  the Royal Order of the Crown - 3rd class after his retirement in May 1913.

Carl Meyer, during his 26-year long activity as city advisor, had a huge impact on Bydgoszcz architecture and layout, during its expansion bloom (end of 19th – beginning of 20th century). He belonged to the German Union of Architects and Engineers and traveled a lot, not only within the German Empire, but also to Italy and France to learn about new trends in architecture and urban planning.
His closest subordinates and associates included people who are authors of many edifices in downtown Bydgoszcz, among others:
 Wilhelm Stagge (associate from 1881 to 1919), his deputy;
 Rudolf Berndt (ass. 1888–1890), a master carpenter;
 Paul Bresgott (from 1891 on), an architect and master mason;
 Karl Bergner (ass. from 1892 on), an architect, who ran a private architectural office, one of the most popular designers in the city, until 1919 (see below);
 Anton Kandler, a municipal construction manager (from 1897 on);
 Richard Köppen, an architect, who worked on city hospital extension project in 1908;
 Theodor Patzwald, an architect, building designer of the city fire station in 1909;
 Otto Brech, an architect, who worked on two main projects, the School of Mechanical Engineering and the Bürgerschule building (today High School Nr.6);
 Paul Sellner, an architect who designed many tenements in Gdańska Street (see below).

Carl Meyer's style fluctuates around forms borrowed from medieval architecture like Gothic architecture. As a man influenced by Hanover school of architecture, he designed buildings set in the Historicism mainstream, nuanced with Neo-gothic and Neo-romanesque elements.

Carl Meyer's preserved accomplishments in Bydgoszcz

Heinrich Rudolf Metzger (1912–1920)
Born in Mainz in 1861, Heinrich Metzger graduated from the Technical University in Berlin. He traveled in Prussia for work: in Szczecin in 1885, as an assistant engineer in the municipal waterworks, in Cologne in 1889, as an engineer in the Canal Construction Inspection, then in Toruń in 1891, as city's chief engineer.

In 1894 he took up the responsibility of gasworks director in Bydgoszcz and on October 1, 1894, he took the position of head of the municipal gas plant. While working in Bydgoszcz, he regularly provided his expertise for the construction and modernization of water supply and sewage systems in other cities such as Leszno, Chełmno, Kętrzyn or Kwidzyn. In 1901, he was elected municipal councilor and on July 12, 1912, he was appointed city construction adviser, taking over Carl Meyer. In particular, during his appointment, he developed the project of Sielanka district (Idyll, in Polish) in the early 1910s.

He retired on December 15, 1919, and thanks to his highly appreciated role, Heinrich took part on January 20, 1920, on behalf of the German party, to the official ceremony where Bydgoszcz re-integrated the motherland: he was one of the signatories to the commemorative protocol. He then moved to Berlin (Charlottenburg), where he died on 22 April 1929.

Independent architects
Apart from citie's official advisors, the Prussian construction community in Bromberg teamed with independent private architects and builders. Those men, gathering bricklayer, mason and carpentry masters, have been involved in the design and the construction of many a building in downtown Bydgoszcz.

Carl Stampehl
Little is known about Carl Stampehl. He was an active architect in the 1870s and 1880s, especially while re-designing several houses along Długa street in Bydgoszcz old town district.

Carl Stampehl's preserved accomplishments in Bydgoszcz

Carl Rose
Carl Emil Heinrich Rose was born on December 11, 1864, in Barth near Stralsund. He studied in a realschule in Barth and then in Stralsund.

In 1882, he began his practical apprenticeship in Bromberg in the company run by his uncle, mason master Albert Rose, established in 1866. He attended a technical school in Buxtehude, where he graduated and passed the master builder 's exam. After a 4-semester technical college in Berlin district of Charlottenburg, he traveled to gain experience to Denmark, Sweden and Norway. At the beginning of September 1890, he returned to Bydgoszcz to take over his uncle's firm. He was professionally active in the city until 1920.

He was a member of the Silesian-Poznan Building Trade Association and from June 7, 1898, he belonged to the Janus Masonic lodge in Bydgoszcz.

Carl Rose's preserved accomplishments in Bydgoszcz

Józef Święcicki

Józef Święcicki (1859 in Bromberg, 1913 in Berlin), has been the most successful and influential architect, builder and construction designer in Bydgoszcz at the end of the 19th century. All his life and his work are related to the city.

Karl Bergner
Karl Bergner was born on March 9, 1864. He has been active in Bromberg as an architect from the 1880s to the First Worl War. He was one of the most prolific architects of his time in the city. His designs usually included Eclecticism style with Neo-Renaissance and Neo-baroque decoration stuccoes.

He ran a company and a technical work office. He also held the position of Municipal Construction Assistant. Having first settled in 1888 at 7 Poznański Square, he set up a design studio there in 1892. He then regularly moved to the houses he designed: Hetmańska Street (1895), Gdańska Street (1896), Śniadecki Street (1897). Like other architects in the city at the eve of the 20th century, Karl Bergner dealt with the design and construction of tenement houses sold at Cieszkowskiego Street.

From October 7, 1899, he became a member of the Janus Masonic lodge in Bydgoszcz.

Karl Bergner's preserved accomplishments in Bydgoszcz

Fritz Weidner

Fritz Weidner (1863 in Nowe Drezdenko, 1950 in Potsdam) was an architect who worked during most of his life in Bromberg. Like his colleague Józef Święcicki his numerous realizations had a profound influence on downtown Bydgoszcz urban landscape.

Paul Böhm
Paul Böhm has been an architect working in Bydgoszcz during the middle of the 1890s and the first decade of the 20th century. He ran an architectural studio and a technical office. He owned the property at 109 Gdańska Street, which is non existent today.
At the turn of the 19th and 20th centuries, he designed and built several houses along Cieszkowskiego Street.

Paul Böhm was an important representative of the Historicism trend in Bydgoszcz's architecture at the end of the 19th century. He turned to Art Nouveau at the beginning of the 20th century.

Paul Böhm's preserved accomplishments in Bydgoszcz

Heinrich Seeling
Heinrich Seeling was born on October 1, 1852, in Zeulenroda-Triebes, Thuringia. His father, Christian Seeling, was a bricklayer, from an Evangelical Lutheran family. As a boy, he practiced with his father's bricklaying craftmen. After having completed a building school in Holzminden, he moved in 1870 to Berlin, where he worked in a construction workshop and joined as a free listener the Academy of Building. After three years of study, he went on an education trip to the south of the German Empire and to Vienna. He then returned to Berlin in 1874 and worked for 2 years in Hugo Licht's workshop. Aterwards, he went on a six-month study trip to Italy and came back to Berlin. In 1877, he started working as a first architect in the construction office of Hermann Ende.
In January 1878 he won the second prize in the competition for the Town Hall in Kaława, which was carried out in 1880–1881. He then won the second prize for a theater project in Halle (1884-1886). The building was designed in accordance with the latest architectural tendencies and technical requirements; for this realization, Seelling was honored with the Prussian Order of the Crown - 4th Class.

From this moment, he devoted his architect's activity to theatre buildings: after designing the Stockholm Royal Theatre, he was appointed in 1890-1892 for the realization of the Municipal Theater in Essen, which designs pioneered many interior and façade solutions. Thanks to this project, he was published in leading architectural journals in Germany.
Several projects were run in the following years:
 Berlin Theater am Schiffbauerdamm (1891–1892);
 Wuppertal town hall (1893);
 the 1000-seats Municipal Theater of Rostock, where he used a facade composition similar to Essen's;
 the Municipal Theatre in Bydgoszcz and Hanover town hall (1894-1896).

Seeling also built a group of houses at Schiklerestrasse in Berlin, where he applied solutions for modern residential and commercial construction. At the end of the 19th century, Heinrich Seeling was appointed member of the Royal Academy in Berlin.

At the start of the 20th century, he shared his time between constructions in Bydgoszcz, such as:
 the Church of Christ the Savior;
 the Villa Heinrich Dietz; 
 Saint Andrew Bobola's Church;
and other projects in the German Empire, among others:
 Municipal Theaters in Aachen (1901), Frankfurt am Main (1902);
 acourt theatre in Gera.
One must notice that Henrich Seeling designed only 2 churches in all his career, and both are located in Bydgoszcz (Protestant Church of Christ the Savior and St Andrew Bobola).

In the years 1904–1910 theaters still remained in the main circle of his interests.
He designed, among others:
 Braunschweig court theater with 1700 seats;
 Nuremberg, Kiel and Freiburg im Breisgau Municipal Theaters;
 AEG store in Berlin.

In 1908, Seeling was elected city building councilor of Charlottenburg, where, in the following years, he designed many edifices. His crowning achievement was the realization of the five-storey Deutsches Opernhaus in 1911–1912, able to house 2300 show-goers; it was the most modern stage installation and original architectural building of its time.

Heinrich Christian Seeling died on February 15, 1932, in Berlin.

Heinrich Seeling's achievements in Bydgoszcz

Erich Lindenburger
Erich Lindenburger was a German architect who worked in Bydgoszcz in the first two decades of the 20th century. He designed representative, metropolitan tenement houses in a style reminiscent of architectural trends from the early 1900s, mainly referring to Art Nouveau.

Erich Lindenburger's achievements in Bydgoszcz

Rudolf Kern

Rudolf Kern probably practiced in the studio of Józef Święcicki. From 1903 to the early 1920s, he ran his own architectural and construction office. Like many other colleagues from Bydgoszcz, he was involved in the design and construction of tenement houses in Cieszkowskiego Street. In Bydgoszcz, he lived in his own house at 72 Gdańska street.

Alfred Schleusener
Alfred Schleusener was active in Bydgoszcz from 1905 to 1944. He ran an architectural office. He was also a construction expert and a member of the State Chamber of Building.

Alfred Schleusener's preserved accomplishments in Bydgoszcz

Paul Sellner
Paul Sellner had a professional practice around 1902–1904, which began in the workshop of Bydgoszcz architect Karl Bergner. In 1904, as an architect, he opened an independent architectural office, which he ran until at least 1915. He lived in Bydgoszcz until 1922.

His style is creative, applied to representative, metropolitan houses in the style of early modernism.

Paul Sellner's preserved accomplishments in Bydgoszcz

Other active Prussian architects

Other local architects from Prussian era

Polish Period (1918-1970s)

Bogdan Raczkowski

Bogdan Raczkowski was born on March 12, 1888, in Poznań.
In March 1921, he moved to Bydgoszcz, where on 29 December, he took the post of city councilor, head of the Ground Construction Office. He served as deputy chairman of the city council for many years.

During his mandate as a counselor, several Bydgoszcz districts have been enriched by a number of residential complexes financed by city magistrates: Babia Wieś, Biedaszkowo, Bielawy, Jachcice and Śródmieście (downtown). Many renovations were made and the aesthetics of the city improved. Raczkowski planned and co-designed the construction of a 600-bed city hospital.

After Invasion of Poland in September 1939, his home at 1 Asnyka street being already occupied by a German dignitary, the family lived with a relative at Weyssenhoff Square. On October 2, 1939, they were all arrested and shot probably in the forest north of the city (Las Gdański), on October 4. Only Raczkowski's son Zdzisław escaped the arrest and survived WWII.

Jan Kossowski

Jan Kossowski (July 13, 1898, in Belarus-December 9, 1958, in Bydgoszcz) was a very prolific Polish architect and builder, mainly associated with Bydgoszcz. His professional activity stretches from the interwar period to the 1940s.

The best villas designed by Kossowski were erected in the Sielanka and Leśne districts and in Sułkowskiego Street. 
Not only did he design houses, but also performed reconstruction of public, industrial buildings and sacral buildings. He is as well the author of the Freedom Monument in downtown Bydgoszcz.

Alfons Licznerski
Alfons Licznerski was born on September 25, 1902, in the village of Sampława then part of East Prussia. He was the son of Józef, a farmer, also Schultheiß of the village. His parents moved to Rożental in 1906, and Alfons attended elementary and primary schools there from 1908 to 1915. In the autumn of 1915, he began his studies in the pre-gymnasium in Lubawa. There, he became interested in socio-national issues and in 1917, he joined the activist movement of the Society of Tomasz Zan. During the meetings of the society, he learned Polish history and literature.

In 1919, he was a member of the forbidden Polish Scouting movement, and from 1920, he was in the first junior high school scouting team. He then attended a classical gymnasium in 1921 in Toruń and after graduation in 1924, he was appointed for military service in Grudziądz. However, after an accident, he was permanently released from the army.

From 1925 to 1933, Alfons Licznerski studied at the Faculty of Architecture of the Gdańsk University of Technology, obtaining in March 1934 the diploma of Civil engineer. During his studies he participated in corporation trips in Pomerelia and Kashubia cities.

During his studies he took longer professional practices in firms and construction offices in Gdynia and Gdańsk (1928–1933). As such he participated, among others, in the building of:
 the Władysławowo railway station (1928);
 a port warehouse and storage facility (Gdynia, 1929–1932);
 a residential worker colony (Gdynia, 1932–1933).

After graduating, he designed the municipal slaughterhouse in Płock (1934–1935), or the expansion of the gymnasium in Gdańsk (1935–1936). He also traveled to gain professional expertise, in Poland and abroad (e.g. Germany), studying urban issues and problems of industrial construction.

In September 1936, he settled in Bydgoszcz, where he worked in the Construction Department of the Municipal Board until the outbreak of World War II. During Occupation of Poland (1939–1945), he kept his position at the Technical Department of the city. At the end of February 1944, he was drafted into the Wehrmacht.

He returned to Bydgoszcz in November 1945 and started working at the Regional Directorate of Spatial Planning, where he was the head of the urban studio (1945–1948). In 1947, at the request of the Theater Reconstruction Committee, he designed a new theater building (today's Polish Theatre in Bydgoszcz). Alfons Licznerski initiated the systematic collection of photographs of Bydgoszcz monuments. After many years in the municipal and regional construction boards and offices, he retired in 1968.

In 1971, was awarded the title of Honorary Member of the Association of the Supporters of Bydgoszcz. He died on June 8, 1976, in Bydgoszcz and was buried in the Nowofarny Cemetery in Bydgoszcz.

Stefan Klajbor
Stefan Klajbor was born on October 20, 1924, in Bydgoszcz.
After WWII, he joined the Presidium of Bydgoszcz National Council and was the main architect of the city until 1958. He had a continuous active production till December 1989, when he retired. He died in Bydgoszcz in 1991.

His most important achievements in Bydgoszcz include the designs of (among others):
 the Pomeranian Philharmonic building (1959);
 the building of Bydgoszcz Polish Federation of Engineering Associations;
 the project of Recreation and Culture Forest Park in Myślęcinek district.

Other active Polish architects

Other noteworthy architects since 1920

See also

 Bydgoszcz
 Bogdan Raczkowski
 Fritz Weidner
 Rudolf Kern
 Józef Święcicki
 Anton Hoffmann
 Jan Kossowski
 Stefan Klajbor

References

Bibliography
 
 
 

Cultural heritage monuments in Bydgoszcz
Villas in Bydgoszcz
19th-century Polish architects
20th-century Polish architects
Architects from Bydgoszcz